The FISA Accountability and Privacy Protection Act of 2013 is a bill sponsored by Sen. Patrick Leahy in the wake of the global surveillance disclosures of 2013.  The bill proposes to limit government surveillance and other reforms of US surveillance.  The bill has been compared to the USA Freedom Act in the House, also supported by Sen. Leahy.

See also
 USA Freedom Act, a related bill in the House.

References

External links
 FISA Accountability and Privacy Protection Act of 2013 at the Library of Congress  
 Sen. Leahy's office on FISA Accountability and Privacy Protection Act of 2013

Global surveillance
Proposed legislation of the 113th United States Congress